Neachrostia is a genus of moths of the family Erebidae. The genus was erected by George Hampson in 1907.

Species
Neachrostia brunneiplaga Swinhoe, 1905
Neachrostia diapera Hampson, 1926
Neachrostia hypomelas Hampson, 1895
Neachrostia inconstans Moore, 1888
Neachrostia nigripunctalis Wileman, 1911
Neachrostia undulata Hampson, 1893

References

Calpinae